The Unfriend is a play written by Steven Moffat.

Production 
The play was due to premiere at the Minerva Theatre, Chichester as part of the 2020 Festival. However, due to the COVID-19 pandemic the play was postponed to 2022. The play began previews on 21 May 2022, with a press night on 26 May. It ended its planned limited run on 9 July 2022. The play is directed by Mark Gatiss (in his directorial debut), designed by Robert Jones, lighting design by Mark Henderson and starring Amanda Abbington, Frances Barber and Reece Shearsmith.

The Unfriend transferred to the West End, opening at the Criterion Theatre on 19 January 2023, following previews from 15 January. It will play a limited run to 16 April 2023, with the original cast from Chichester all returning.

The playtext was published by Nick Hern Books on 26 May 2021.

Cast and characters

Critical reception 
The Chichester production of the play received positive reviews from WhatsOnStage.com, The Daily Telegraph, The Stage and The Guardian.

References 

2022 plays
British plays